In physics and mathematics, the Golden–Thompson inequality is a trace inequality between exponentials of symmetric and Hermitian matrices proved independently by  and . It has been developed in the context of statistical mechanics, where it has come to have a particular significance.

Statement 
The Golden–Thompson inequality states that for (real) symmetric or (complex) Hermitian matrices A and B, the following trace inequality holds:

This inequality is well defined, since the quantities on either side are real numbers. For the expression on right hand side of the inequality, this can be seen by rewriting it as  using the cyclic property of the trace.

Motivation 

The Golden–Thompson inequality can be viewed as a generalization of a stronger statement for real numbers. If a and b are two real numbers, then the exponential of a+b is the product of the exponential of a with the exponential of b:

If we replace a and b with commuting matrices A and B, then the same inequality  holds.

This relationship is not true if A and B do not commute. In fact,  proved that if A and B are two Hermitian matrices for which the Golden–Thompson inequality is verified as an equality, then the two matrices commute.

Generalizations 
The Golden–Thompson inequality generalizes to any unitarily invariant norm.

A naive attempt at generalization does not work: the inequality

is false. For three matrices, the correct generalization takes the following form:

Note that, if  and  commute, then , and the inequality for three matrices reduces to the original from Golden and Thompson.

 used the Kostant convexity theorem to generalize the Golden–Thompson inequality to all compact Lie groups.

References

External links

Linear algebra
Matrix theory
Inequalities